The 1982 AIAW National Division II Basketball Championship was the third annual and final tournament hosted by the Association for Intercollegiate Athletics for Women to determine the national champion of collegiate basketball among its Division II members in the United States.

The tournament was held at the College of Charleston in Charleston, South Carolina.

Francis Marion defeated College of Charleston in the championship game, 92–83, to capture the Patriots' first AIAW Division II national title.

Format
Eight teams participated in a single-elimination tournament, a decrease in eight teams from the previous year's championship.

The tournament also included a third-place game for the two teams that lost in the semifinal games.

Tournament bracket

See also
1982 AIAW National Division I Basketball Championship (final edition)
1982 AIAW National Division III Basketball Championship (final edition)
1982 NAIA women's basketball tournament

References

AIAW women's basketball tournament
AIAW Division II
AIAW National Division II Basketball Championship
1982 in sports in South Carolina
Women's sports in South Carolina